Growing Up in Public is the tenth solo studio album by American rock musician Lou Reed, released in April 1980 by Arista Records.

Growing Up in Public peaked at No. 158 on the Billboard 200. One single was released from the album, "The Power of Positive Drinking", which failed to chart.

Production
Michael Fonfara and Reed produced the album. It was written and recorded over a period of six weeks in sessions that took place at George Martin's AIR Studios in Montserrat.

Critical reception
Rolling Stone called the album "a polished package of bombastic rock & roll — indeed, probably Reed’s best commercial shot since his 1974 Top Ten anomaly, Sally Can’t Dance." Trouser Press wrote that Reed uses "driving rock and delicate melodicism to back thoughtful lyrics and impassioned singing."

Track listing

Personnel
Adapted from the Growing Up in Public liner notes.

Musicians
 Lou Reed – vocals; guitar
 Michael Fonfara – keyboards; guitar
 Chuck Hammer – guitar; guitar synthesizer
 Michael Suchorsky – drums
 Ellard "Moose" Boles – bass guitar; backing vocals
 Stuart Heinrich – guitar; backing vocals

Production and artwork
 Lou Reed – producer
 Michael Fonfara – producer
 Corky Stasiak – engineer
 Tony George – assistant engineer
 Howard Fritzson – design
 Mick Rock – photography

Chart performance

See also
 List of albums released in 1980
 Lou Reed's discography

References

External links
 

1980 albums
Albums produced by Lou Reed
Lou Reed albums
Albums with cover art by Mick Rock
Arista Records albums
Albums recorded at AIR Studios